Duncan Aketch Ochieng (born 31 August 1978) is a Kenyan footballer who plays for Kenyan Premier League side Sofapaka as a goalkeeper. He spent the majority of his career at Mathare United, where he spent 16 years in 4 different stints. He also previously played for now defunct Mumias Sugar, V.League 1 side Sông Lam Nghệ An and Swedish Division 2 side IK Sleipner. He has also made several appearances for the Kenya national team, with whom he won the 2013 CECAFA Cup on home soil. He played the full 90 minutes in the final against Sudan, keeping a clean sheet to help his side to a 2–0 win and a 6th regional title.

During a 2013 FKF President's Cup semi-final on 20 October 2013, a shocking goalkeeping blunder by Ochieng allowed Allan Wanga of A.F.C. Leopards to seal a 2−0 win to take his side to the final. With Wanga sent through on goal by Mike Baraza, Ochieng rushed out to clear the danger, comically missing the ball and leaving Wanga with an empty net to score in.

Honours

Club
Mathare United
 Kenyan Premier League: 2008
 President's Cup: 1998, 2000

Tusker
 Kenyan Premier League: 2011

International
 CECAFA Cup: 2002, 2013

References

External links
 
 Duncan Ochieng profile at Goal.com

1978 births
Living people
IK Sleipner players
Mathare United F.C. players
Sofapaka F.C. players
Song Lam Nghe An FC players
Tusker F.C. players
Kenyan footballers
Kenya international footballers
Kenyan expatriate footballers
Expatriate footballers in Sweden
Expatriate footballers in Vietnam
Association football goalkeepers
Mumias Sugar F.C. players